Jaane Pehchaane Se... Ye Ajnabbi is an Indian television show that aired on Indian television channel Star One. The show premièred on Star One on 19 October 2009 and ended on 17 September 2010.

Plot
This story is about a girl named Ayesha. She lives happily with her elder sister Divya, brother-in-law Jay Vardhan Singh and nephew Nihaal. But her life takes a different turn when she loses her sister and brother-in-law in a car accident. Ayesha moves to Mumbai with Nihal. To make ends meet she starts working as a housekeeper at the luxurious Hotel Ramada where Veer Vardhan Singh is her boss. Veer is the younger brother of Jay, a fact of which both Ayesha and Veer are unaware. Veer is trying to locate Nihal, who is the future heir to the family business. Veer is smitten by Ayesha but doesn't realize she is Divya's sister. Later, he finds out Ayesha's real identity; they have a big fight over guardianship of Nihaal. Veer and his mother Kamini Vardhan Singh file a case against Ayesha and get Nihal's custody. Veer develops a soft corner and lets Ayesha stay with his family to take care of Nihal. Slowly, they start to fall for each other. Ayesha finds out that Jay and Divya's death wasn't an accident but a murder; she tries to locate their murderer. Meanwhile the unknown murderer hires a hit man who apparently kills Ayesha by pushing her from a cliff.

Three months later, Veer is constructing a Day Care Centre in memory of Ayesha. Radhika, a rich fashion designer, enters his life. Soon, Radhika is revealed to be Ayesha who has survived the murder attempt and got a new face by plastic surgery. She wants to take revenge from Veer, whom she believes to be her attacker. Later, when Veer risks his life for her, she realizes that he is  innocent. She tells him that someone from the Vardhan family killed Jay and Divya; the same person now wants to hurt her and Nihal. Kamini is then revealed to be the culprit, who not only attacked Ayesha but also killed Jay (her son) and Divya. One day, Ayesha overhears Kamini talking to herself about all her crimes. Kamini and Ayesha attack each other, which only results in Nihal getting injured. Kamini blackmails Ayesha into hiding her crimes. When Nihal recovers, he remembers everything about Kamini. Then Kamini calls a famous specialist, Dr. Dhruv Khanna, who is a friend of Ayesha. Dhruv, Ayesha and Nihaal plot together and get Kamini arrested for murder of Divya and Jay. Finally, Veer and Ayesha get married and live happily.

Cast

Main
 Sidharth Shukla as Veer Vardhan Singh
 Sanjeeda Sheikh as Ayesha / Radhika 
 Aditi Tailang as Roli Sharma / Ayesha

Recurring
 Karishma Tanna as Avni
 Lavina Tandon as Parminder Kaur 
 Simple Kaul as Natasha Sareen
 Diwakar Pundir as Jay Vardhan Singh 
 Malini Kapoor as Divya Vardhan Singh 
 Preeti Gandwani as Nandini
 Abir Goswami as Avinash
 Varsha Usgaonkar as Kamini Vardhan Singh
 Mihir Mishra as Dr.Dhruv Khanna
 Rahul Pendkalkar as Nihal Singh 
 Abhimaan Balhara as Rajdeep Sahni
 Rocky Verma as Hotel's Guest

References

External links
 Official Website

Star One (Indian TV channel) original programming
Indian television soap operas
Serial drama television series
2009 Indian television series debuts
2010 Indian television series endings